T Lake Falls is the tallest waterfall in New York State and in the Adirondacks, at minimum doubling the height of Niagara Falls in Niagara Falls, NY. It is located in Hamilton County, New York in the West Canada Lake Wilderness Area. T Lake Falls with a height stated of 350 feet up to 600, depending on the source, reasoning behind judgment of the height is the crescent edge at the top of the falls and where the falls officially start. T Lake and the falls have been an attraction because of the several different ways to hike in, and the option of staying at the lean-to at the lake. There is also swimming in the pool at the bottom of the falls in the summer months and snow shoeing, cross-country skiing to the falls to go ice climbing in the winter.

The height makes the falls a dangerous place, and several fatalities have occurred there; a 14-year-old boy fell 200 feet into the pool at the bottom of the falls during a summer camp hiking trip on Aug 18, 1960.  A 17-year-old girl lost her footing crossing the top of the falls and uncontrollably tumbled down 600 feet on Aug 29, 1973. The coroner’s physician said she ‘died of massive head injuries.'  Other fatalities that have occurred there were on July 5, 1965 a male went over the falls and died, on Aug 1, 1993 another male Charles R. Heise, 18 years and 7 and a 1/2 months old went over the falls and died. Rescuers must hike at least 5 miles just to get to endangered persons, and they are sometimes brought out on horseback. There are several memorials at the bottom of the falls for all the people that have lost their lives. Because of these fatalities, the trail beyond the lake and lean-to to the falls are no longer maintained and have been closed by DEC. However some hikers still venture to the falls on their own.

The falls is on an unnamed tributary of the South Branch West Canada Creek. This area was used by Native American hunters and first settlers. There are three different ways of hiking into these falls; two of them are from Piseco and the third is from Nobleboro off Mountain Rd.  First, is the actual trail head across the road from Poplar Point state campsite. There is a trail sign marking where it begins and states that it is 3.6 miles to the lake where the lean-to is. After the lake, is a 1.8 mile hike to the falls on an unmaintained trail that is difficult to follow.  The other way in, coming from Piseco, is bushwhacking off the Mill Stream trail starting on Haskell’s Road.  This way in is considered easier because the trail is flatter, if one has the skills of bushwhacking, from Mill Stream to the state trail.  The third way in is off Mountain Home Road, which brings one to the bottom of the falls. It is also the shortest: 5 miles from the trail head to the falls.

References

Landforms of Hamilton County, New York